Pia Ann-Katrine Sundstedt (born 2 May 1975, in Kokkola) is a professional former cyclist, who competes in road bicycle racing and mountain bike racing, as well as cross-country skiing events. Sundstedt competed in the Summer Olympics for Finland. Having started in 2006, Sundstedt competes for Rocky Mountain/Business Objects mountain bike racing team.

In 2000, Sundstedt won the Montreal World Cup event and competed for Finland at the 2000 Summer Olympics. In recent years, the four-time national Finnish national road cycling champion focused her attentions toward marathon mountain bike races and cross country skiing events. Her efforts paid off in 2006 when Sundstedt captured two World Cup events and the overall individual points championship in the UCI World Cup for Cross Country Marathon (XCM).

In 2008, Sundstedt came 1st in the Women's Category at the Absa Cape Epic with teammate Alison Sydor.

She competed at the 2012 Summer Olympics in the Women's road race, finishing 20th and in the Women's time trial finishing 11th.

Major results 
2012
Mountain Bike Racing
1st, Birkebeinerrittet, Rena-Lillehammer (NOR)

2011
 Mountain Bike Racing
 1st, UCI World Cup XCM Overall
 1st, XCM (GER)
 1st, Birkebeinerrittet, Rena-Lillehammer (NOR)
 1st, CykelVasan, Sälen-Mora (SWE)
 1st, Trans Germany, (GER)
 4th, XCM World Championships, Montello (ITA/CM)
 Road Bicycle Racing
 1st,  Finnish Road Race Champion
 1st,  Finnish Time Trial Champion
 3rd, Golan I, (SYR/1.2)
 3rd, Golan II, (SYR/1.2)
 5th, Chrono des Nations, (FRA/1.1)

2010
 Mountain Bike Racing
 1st, Birkebeinerrittet (NOR)

2008
 Mountain Bike Racing
 1st, UCI World Cup XCM Overall
 1st, Birkebeinerrittet (NOR)
 1st Absa Cape Epic Women's Category

2007
 Mountain Bike Racing
 1st, UCI World Cup XCM Overall
 1st, Birkebeinerrittet (NOR)
 3rd, XCM (GER)

2006
 Mountain Bike Racing
 1st, UCI World Cup XCM Overall
 1st, UCI World Cup, Val Thorens (FRA)
 1st, UCI World Cup, Mont Saint Anne (CAN)
 2nd, UCI World Cup, Naoussa (GER)
 3rd, UCI World Cup, Villabassa (ITA)
 1st, Raid Ardenne Bleue, Verviers (BEL)
 1st,  Finnish National Championships XCM, Lappeenranta (FIN)
 1st, Birkebeinerrittet (NOR)
 1st, Bike Festival Willingen, Willingen (GER)
 2nd, European Championships UEC, Chies d'Alpago (ITA)
 5th, UCI Mountain Bike Marathon World Championships, Oisans (FRA)
 5th, Sea Otter Classic, Monterey, California (USA)
Cross-country skiing / Ski marathon
 1st, Pustertal Ski Marathon Classic, (ITA)
 2nd, Hotzenwald Ski Marathon Classic, (GER)
 3rd, Pustertal Ski Marathon Skating, (ITA)
 7th, FIS Marathon Cup, (FRA)
 3rd, Fäboda Loppet, (FIN)
 1st, Kokkola Town Champion, (FIN)
 1st, Bernau Skating Jet, (GER)
 1st, Trace Vosgienne, (GER)

2005
 Mountain Bike Racing
 1st, European Mountain Bike Marathon Championship
 5th, UCI Mountain Bike Marathon World Championship
 Road Bicycle Racing
 1st,  Finnish Road Race Champion

2002
 Road Bicycle Racing
 1st,  Finnish Road Race Champion

2001
 Road Bicycle Racing
 1st,  Finnish Road Race Champion
 1st overall, GP Féminine International du Québec, Quebec (CAN)

2000
 Road Bicycle Racing
 1st, La Coupe du Monde Cycliste Féminine de Montréal (Montreal World Cup)
 2nd, La Flèche Wallonne Féminine (World Cup)
 21st, Summer Olympics Women's Road Race
1999
 Road Bicycle Racing
 6th, La Flèche Wallonne Féminine (World Cup)
 3rd overall, Giro del Trentino (ITA)
 Stage win, Giro d'Italia Femminile

1998
 Road Bicycle Racing
 2nd, La Flèche Wallonne Féminine (World Cup)
 1st overall and 1 stage win, Giro Toscana (ITA)
 Stage win, Giro d'Italia Femminile

1997
 Road Bicycle Racing
 1st,  Finnish Road Race Champion
 1st overall and 1 stage win, Giro del Trentino (ITA)

References

External links
 Official site

1975 births
Living people
Finnish female cyclists
Marathon mountain bikers
Finnish female cross-country skiers
Olympic cyclists of Finland
People from Kokkola
Cyclists at the 2000 Summer Olympics
Cyclists at the 2012 Summer Olympics
Finnish mountain bikers
Swedish-speaking Finns
Sportspeople from Central Ostrobothnia